Franklin Zielski (1 March 1941 – 27 April 2021) was a Canadian rower. He competed in the men's coxless four event at the 1960 Summer Olympics.

References

External links
 

1941 births
2021 deaths
Canadian male rowers
Olympic rowers of Canada
Rowers at the 1960 Summer Olympics
Sportspeople from Welland